Al-Barka, officially the Municipality of Al-Barka (Tausūg: Lupah Al-Barka; Chavacano: Municipalidad de Al-Barka), is a  municipality in the province of Basilan, Philippines. According to the 2020 census, it has a population of 23,736 people.

It was created by Muslim Mindanao Autonomy Act No. 191, ratified by plebiscite on May 22, 2006. It is composed of 16 barangays that were formerly part of Tipo-Tipo.

Geography

Barangays
Al-Barka is politically subdivided into 16 barangays.

Climate

Demographics

In the 2020 census, Al-Barka had a population of 23,736.

Economy

References

External links
Al-Barka Profile at the DTI Cities and Municipalities Competitive Index
[ Philippine Standard Geographic Code]

Municipalities of Basilan